Sophie Girard may refer to:

Sophie Girard, character in Last Resort (TV series)
Sophie Girard, character, see List of True Jackson, VP episodes